Thyretes buettikeri is a moth in the  family Erebidae. It was described by Wiltshire in 1983. It is found in Saudi Arabia.

References

Natural History Museum Lepidoptera generic names catalog

Moths described in 1983
Syntomini